Renmore Barracks is a military installation in Renmore, Ireland

History

The barracks were built by Colleran Brothers, a Dublin-based contractor, and completed in 1881. Their creation took place as part of the Cardwell Reforms which encouraged the localisation of British military forces. The barracks became the depot for the 87th (Royal Irish Fusiliers) Regiment of Foot and the 88th Regiment of Foot (Connaught Rangers). Following the Childers Reforms, the 88th Regiment of Foot (Connaught Rangers) and 94th Regiment of Foot amalgamated to form the Connaught Rangers with its depot in the barracks in 1881.

The Connaught Rangers was disbanded at the time of Irish Independence in 1922. The barracks were taken over by the Irish Army at that time and then renamed Dún Uí Mhaoilíosa after Liam Mellows, an Irish Republican, in 1952. The barracks are now home to the 1st Infantry Battalion.

Dún Uí Mhaoilíosa Museum
Renmore Barracks features a museum that recalls the history of the Connaught Rangers, as well as Renmore Barracks' later role as home to the 1st Infantry Battalion of the Irish Army. Irish soldiers engaging in UN Peacekeeping in Congo, Cyprus, Lebanon, Chad and Afghanistan are remembered at Dún Uí Mhaoilíosa Museum. An axe used by African tribesman in the Niemba Ambush in the Congo in which nine Irish Army soldiers were killed is featured in the exhibits.

The museum has forged links with the Connaught Rangers Association, established in Boyle in 2002.

Dún Uí Mhaoilíosa Museum is not fully open to the public, but visitors can make an appointment to visit by contacting the museum curator.

See also
 List of Irish military installations

References

 

Barracks in the Republic of Ireland